The U.S. Small Business Administration Community Advantage Loan program is designed for new and existing businesses that need loans under $250,000.  The loan can be used to finance a startup company or expand an existing small business or buy real estate.  The SBA guarantees 85 percent of loans up to $150,000 and 75 percent of loans greater than $150,000. 

Launched in 2011, the Community Advantage program intends to expand access to capital in underserved communities by allowing mission-focused, community-based financial institutions – including a Certified Development Company – to offer this loan to small businesses.  Greater access to credit can help spur firms to grow and hire, giving the economy a boost. 

The SBA designates specific lenders throughout the United States to offer Community Advantage loans.  The first six lenders selected for the program were: CDC Small Business Finance, California; Cen-Tex CDC, Texas; The Progress Fund in Greensburg, Pennsylvania; Eastern Maine Development Corporation, Maine;  Idaho-Nevada Community Development Financial Institution, Idaho; Kentucky Highlands Investment Corporation, Kentucky.  Thirty-four other lenders have since been approved.

Loan Size and Terms
Maximum Loan Size: $250,000 
Terms: 7–10 years for working capital, inventory, business acquisitions, tenant improvements, and start-up expenses
Terms: 25 years for real estate
Interest Rate: up to Prime + 6%
No pre-payment penalties

Eligibility
There are specific eligibility criteria for the Community Advantage loan, which include credit history, cash flow and industry experience.  A designated Community Advantage lender can help a small business owner determine if they can qualify by reviewing an eligibility form.

References

Small Business Administration
Loans